Karoline Schuch (born 19 October 1981) is a German actress. She has appeared in more than 50 films and television shows since 2002.

Selected filmography
 Zeiten ändern dich (2010)
 Men Do What They Can (2012)
 Guardians (2012)
  (2013)
 Ich bin dann mal weg (2015)
  (2017, TV film)
 Balloon (2018)

References

External links

1981 births
Living people
Actors from Jena
People from Bezirk Gera
German film actresses
21st-century German actresses